The following is a list of historical earthquakes with epicenters located within the boundaries of Oklahoma. Only earthquakes of greater than or equal to magnitude 4.5 are included. Information pertaining to time, magnitude, epicenter, and depth is retrieved from the United States Geological Survey or, when USGS information is unavailable, the Oklahoma Geological Survey where applicable. All times are given in Coordinated Universal Time (UTC) rather than local time (CT).

Earthquakes

See also
2011 Oklahoma earthquake
2016 Oklahoma earthquake
Oklahoma earthquake swarms (2009–present)
Geology of Oklahoma

References

External links
 Magnitude 4.5+ Earthquakes in Oklahoma from the United States Geological Survey - List incomplete for older earthquakes.
 

 
Earthquakes
Oklahoma